Ballina Seagulls Rugby League Football Club is an Australian rugby league football club based in Ballina, New South Wales formed in the late 1920s. The club has both junior and senior teams.

Team of the century
To coincide with the centenary of Rugby League in Australia, the Seagulls picked their team of the century:

Fullback: Michael Ross.
Wingers: Brian Adam, Len McMullen.
Centres: Jack Reardon (captain), Brad Mansfield.
Five-eighth: Chris Storrier.
Halfback: Wayne Cullen.
Lock: Shane Miles.
Second-row: Mitchell Aubusson, Michael Boyd.
Front-row: Frank Curran, Mick Koellner.
Hooker: Brenton Bowen.
Reserve backs: Dick Roberts, Darren Hampton, Ron Cooper.
Reserve forwards: Max Beecher, Josh Mather, Keith ‘Sprogs’ Miller.
Coach: Greg Fryer.

Notable juniors
Frank Curran (1931-37 South Sydney Rabbitohs)
Mitchell Aubusson (2007-20 Sydney Roosters)
James Aubusson (2007-10 Melbourne Storm & Sydney Roosters)
James Roberts (2011- South Sydney Rabbitohs, Penrith Panthers, Gold Coast Titans & Brisbane Broncos)
Caleb Binge (2014 Gold Coast Titans)
Brian Kelly (2017- Manly Sea Eagles & Gold Coast Titans)
Nick Meaney (2018- Newcastle Knights, Canterbury & Melbourne Storm)

References

External links
 
 Ballina Seagulls on Facebook

Rugby league teams in New South Wales
Rugby clubs established in 1920
1920 establishments in Australia
Ballina, New South Wales
Ballina Shire